Andrew Jackson Higgins may refer to:
Andrew Higgins (1886–1952),  American shipbuilder
Andrew Jackson Higgins (judge) (1921–2011), American judge